The Ittefaq Group (English The Unity Group) was a Pakistani integrated steel started by 7 brothers of Shareef Family in 1939, producer with huge operations in Punjab. It was sold to Al-Rehmat Group of Companies in 2004.

History
It was founded by seven brothers in 1939 as a small foundry. Among the founders, the major contributions were made by the brothers Mian Barkat Ali and Muhammad Sharif. The word Ittefaq in some context means Unity in English language (implying unity among 7 founding brothers).

The father of Muhammad Nawaz Sharif (former Prime Minister), initially set up an iron-melting furnace in, Lahore and quickly expanded this business in the early years of Pakistan.

Till 1960, the Business of this company spreaded internationally. During 1965, they were the largest importers of steel in South Asia Region.   
By 1971, it was pakistan's largest steel industry starting to make presence in steel industry in  Pakistan. In 1972, Prime Minister Zulfikar Ali Bhutto nationalized the steel industry, including the Ittefaq family business empire, as it was the biggest profit making industry for Pakistan 3— Ittefaq Group.

After nationalising this industry, its earnings were deadly dropped but despite all the efforts by Shareef Family it was not privatised due to various political issues.

In 1978, General Mohammad Zia ul-Haq returned the business after developing political links with the Sharifs. In 1983, Zia ul-Haq appointed Nawaz Sharif as finance minister in the Punjab provincial cabinet. Then after the Pakistani general election, 1988, Nawaz Sharif formed and headed the provincial government in Punjab. In November 1990, Nawaz Sharif became the Prime Minister of Pakistan for the first time.

In 2004, the Ittefaq Group was acquired by Al-Rehmat Group of Companies of Faisalabad for 2.159 billion. The sell-out was called by the Lahore High Court to pay up the loan which Ittefaq Group had taken between 1982 and 1988.

Upon the plea of family of Mian Mehraj Din (one of the seven brothers who set up Ittefaq Group and founder of Haseeb Waqas Group of Companies ) that the evaluation of assets is wrong Ittefaq Foundry was finally sold out to Al-Rehmat Group for  6 billion.

References 

Manufacturing companies based in Lahore
Steel companies of Pakistan
Sharif family
Manufacturing companies established in 1970
Defunct manufacturing companies of Pakistan
Manufacturing companies disestablished in 2004
Mergers and acquisitions of Pakistani companies
2004 mergers and acquisitions
Pakistani companies disestablished in 2004